Moukhtar Sayed (born 16 April 1942) is a Moroccan basketball player. He competed in the men's tournament at the 1968 Summer Olympics.

References

1942 births
Living people
Moroccan men's basketball players
Olympic basketball players of Morocco
Basketball players at the 1968 Summer Olympics
Sportspeople from Rabat